Leszkowice may refer to the following places in Poland:
Leszkowice, Lower Silesian Voivodeship (south-west Poland)
Leszkowice, Lublin Voivodeship (east Poland)